Nanmi or Nanpie is a traditional Dai sauce-like side dish made with various fresh ingredients, herbs and spices.

Nan piě is made by pestling various ingredients to form a pungent paste which is accompanied with other dishes such as rice. It can be also used as a dip. Common variations  of nanmi are tamarillo nanpie, goby nanpie and black nightshade nanpie. Popular herbs and spices used in nanpie are, coriander, chili peppers, sawtooth coriander, garlic, ginger and basil. Nanpie is a key dish  during traditional Dai banquets and it is said that the more nanpie are on the table the more delicious and important the meal is.

Nanpie was featured on the Netflix food documentary series, Flavorful Origins in the second episode or the second season which highlighted Yunnanese culinary traditions.

References

Chinese cuisine
Yunnan cuisine
Burmese cuisine